John Wilbur may refer to:

John Wilbur (Quaker minister) (1774–1856), American Quaker minister and religious thinker
John Wilbur (American football) (1943–2013), former American football offensive lineman